Isanthrene aterrima is a moth of the subfamily Arctiinae. It was described by Francis Walker in 1865. It is found in Tefé in Brazil and in Ecuador.

References

 

Euchromiina
Moths described in 1865